The Jersey-Atlantic Wind Farm in Atlantic City, New Jersey is the first coastal wind farm in the United States and the first wind farm in New Jersey. It became operational in March 2006  and consists of five 1.5 MW turbines built by General Electric.

The wind farm is located onshore at the Atlantic County Utilities Authority (ACUA) Wastewater Treatment Plant on U.S. Route 30 and is visible from highways approaching Atlantic City.  The treatment plant uses approximately 50% of the wind-generated capacity from the wind turbines, providing about 60% of the wastewater plant's electricity needs, with the remaining energy being provided to the main power grid for resale as premium renewable electricity.

See also

Wind power in New Jersey
Port Jersey
List of tallest buildings in Atlantic City
Atlantic Wind Connection
List of wind farms in the United States

References

External links
 Atlantic County Utilities Authority Wind Farm Overview
 Jersey-Atlantic Wind Farm Wind Overview by Reseller
 Jersey-Atlantic Wind Farm Wind Reseller Page
  Live Camera of Jersey-Atlantic Wind Farm In Action

Energy infrastructure completed in 2006
Landmarks in New Jersey
Buildings and structures in Atlantic City, New Jersey
Wind farms in New Jersey